The 18th Indiana Volunteer Infantry Regiment was an infantry regiment that served in the Union Army during the American Civil War.

Service
The 18th Indiana Volunteer Infantry was organized at Indianapolis, Indiana, on August 16, 1861.
Battle of Pea Ridge
Battle of Port Gibson
Battle of Champion Hill
Battle of Big Black River
Siege of Vicksburg
Battle of Cedar Creek
The regiment mustered out of service on August 28, 1865.

Total strength and casualties
The regiment lost 5 officers and 68 enlisted men killed in action or died of wounds and 1 officers and 130 enlisted men who died of disease, for a total of 204 fatalities.

Commanders
 Colonel Thomas Pattison
 Colonel Henry Dana Washburn

See also

 List of Indiana Civil War regiments
 Indiana in the Civil War

Notes

References
The Civil War Archive - Indiana Units
Civil War - Indiana

Units and formations of the Union Army from Indiana
1861 establishments in Indiana
Military units and formations established in 1861
Military units and formations disestablished in 1865